Rhythm in Space is a public art work by artist Max Bill located at the Lynden Sculpture Garden near Milwaukee, Wisconsin. The abstract sculpture is a column topped by three overlapping rings with the outer edges contiguous to the inner ones; it is installed on the lawn.

References

1967 sculptures
Outdoor sculptures in Milwaukee
Stone sculptures in Wisconsin
1967 establishments in Wisconsin